Hamza El Kaouakibi (born 22 May 1998) is a Moroccan footballer who plays as a defender for Benevento.

Club career
El Kaouakibi made his Serie C debut for Pistoiese on 30 September 2018, in a game against Gozzano. On 26 July 2019, he joined Piacenza on a season-long loan. On 16 January 2020, he signed with Pianese in Serie C. On 11 August 2020 he moved to Südtirol on a season-long loan.

On 3 August 2021 he joined Pordenone on loan.

On 14 July 2022 he joined Benevento on permanent basis.

International career
Born in Italy, El Kaouakibi is of Moroccan descent; he has represented Morocco internationally at youth level.

References

External links
 
 

1998 births
Living people
Sportspeople from the Metropolitan City of Bologna
Footballers from Emilia-Romagna
Moroccan footballers
Italian footballers
Italian people of Moroccan descent
Italian sportspeople of African descent
Association football defenders
Bologna F.C. 1909 players
U.S. Pistoiese 1921 players
Piacenza Calcio 1919 players
F.C. Südtirol players
Pordenone Calcio players
Benevento Calcio players
Serie B players
Serie C players
Morocco under-20 international footballers